Fruit buns are a type of sweet roll made with fruit, fruit peel, spices and sometimes nuts. They are a tradition in Britain and former British colonies including Jamaica, Australia, Singapore and India. They are made with fruit and fruit peel and are similar to Bath buns, which are sprinkled and cooked with sugar nibs. One variety is a currant bun.

See also
 Hot cross bun
 Bath bun
 Sally Lunn bun
 Fruitcake
 List of buns

References

Sweet breads
British breads
Dried fruit